Dean David (or Din, ; born 14 March 1996) is an Israeli footballer who plays as a forward for Israeli Premier League club Maccabi Haifa and the Israel football team.

Early life
David was born and raised in Nehora, Israel, to a family of Jewish descent. His younger brother Yanay David is also a footballer who plays for Israeli club Bnei Eilat.

He was enlisted to serve as a soldier in the Israel Defense Forces in 2014.

Club career

Maccabi Haifa
On 5 October 2022, David scored both his debut goal as well as his Israeli side's first away goal in the 2022–23 UEFA Champions League group stage, coming on as 72nd substitute against Italian side Juventus, in a match that ended in a 1–3 away loss for Maccabi Haifa.

International career
He has been a youth international for the Israel U-19 in 2014, and for the Israel U-21 from 2015 to 2016.

David was first called-up to the Israeli senior side on 17 March 2022, ahead of the friendly matches against Germany and Romania. He made his senior debut for the Israel national team on 26 March 2022, coming on as 63rd substitute against Germany, in a friendly match that ended in a 0–2 away loss for Israel.

International goals

Honours 
Maccabi Haifa
 Israeli Premier League: 2021–22
 Israel Toto Cup (Ligat Ha'Al): 2021–22
 Israel Super Cup: 2021

See also 
List of Jewish footballers
Lists of Jews in sports
List of Israelis

References

External links 
 

1996 births
Living people
Israeli Jews
Jewish footballers
Israeli footballers
Hapoel Ashkelon F.C. players
F.C. Ashdod players
Maccabi Haifa F.C. players
Israeli Premier League players
Liga Leumit players
Footballers from Southern District (Israel)
Israel international footballers
Israel youth international footballers
Israel under-21 international footballers
Association football forwards